One of the earliest telecasts of a NASCAR race was the 1960 Daytona 500, parts of which was presented as part of CBS Sports Spectacular, with announcer Bud Palmer.

In the ensuing years, but before 1979, there were three main sources of NASCAR telecasts:
ABC's Wide World of Sports, the sports anthology program, provided coverage of select NASCAR Winston Cup races in the 1970s.  In 1971, it presented a 200-lap race at Greenville-Pickens Speedway in its entirety, the first such broadcast of a NASCAR race.  Throughout the 1970s, ABC presented portions of the Daytona 500, Southern 500, and other important races.
In the late 1970s, CBS Sports Spectacular aired some races; like Wide World of Sports, they were taped and edited.
Car and Track, a weekly auto racing show hosted by Bud Lindemann, recapped all of NASCAR's top-series races in the 1960s and 1970s in a weekly 30-minute syndicated show.

List of races televised

1960

In February 1960, CBS sent a "skeleton" production crew to Daytona Beach, Florida and the Daytona International Speedway to cover the Daytona 500's Twin 100 (now the Bluegreen Vacations Duel) qualifying races on February 12, 1960. The production crew also stayed to broadcast portions of the Daytona 500 itself, two days later. The event was hosted by John S. Palmer. CBS would continue to broadcast portions of races for the next 18 years, along with ABC and NBC.

1961

1962

From 1962 to 1978, the Daytona 500 was shown on ABC's Wide World of Sports. During the 1960s and early 1970s, the race was filmed and an edited highlight package aired the following weekend. In 1974, ABC began the first semi-live coverage (joined-in-progress) of the Daytona 500. Coverage was normally timed to begin when the race was halfway over. Brief taped highlights of the start and early segments were shown, then ABC joined the race live already in progress, picking up approximately the last 90 minutes of the race. This format continued through 1978.

1963

1964

1965

1966

1967

1968

1969

See also
List of Daytona 500 broadcasters
List of Wide World of Sports (American TV series) announcers
List of events broadcast on Wide World of Sports (American TV series)
NASCAR on television in the 1970s
NASCAR on television in the 1980s
NASCAR on television in the 1990s
NASCAR on television in the 2000s
NASCAR on television in the 2010s

References

ABC Sports
CBS Sports
NBC Sports
Wide World of Sports (American TV series)
CBS Sports Spectacular
 
 
 
 
 
 
 
 
 
 
 
1960s
1960s in American television